Calliostoma diadematum is a species of sea snail, a marine gastropod mollusk in the family Calliostomatidae.

Some authors place this taxon in the subgenus Calliostoma (Benthastelena) .

Description
The shell attains a height of 6 mm.

Distribution
This species occurs in the Coral Sea and the Chesterfield Islands.

References

 Marshall, B.A. (1995). Calliostomatidae (Gastropoda: Trochoidea) from New Caledonia, the Loyalty Islands and the northern Lord Howe Rise . pp. 381–458 in Bouchet, P. (ed.). Résultats des Campagnes MUSORSTOM, Vol. 14 . Mém. Mus. natn. Hist. nat. 167 : 381-458

External links

diadematum
Gastropods described in 1995